Bannigadi Jayagad (Nepali: बान्नीगडीजैगड ) is a Gaupalika(Nepali: गाउपालिका ; gaupalika) in Achham District in the Sudurpashchim Province of far-western Nepal. 
Bannigadi Jayagad has a population of 17359.The land area is 58.26 km2.

References

Rural municipalities in Achham District
Populated places in Achham District
Rural municipalities of Nepal established in 2017